Jonathan Stranks (born 16 December 1994) is a British acrobatic gymnast who won the title of world men's fours champion with Adam Buckingham, Adam McAssey and Alex Uttley in July 2010 in Poland.

Stranks was a member of Spelbound, the gymnastic group who rose to fame in 2010, winning the fourth series of Britain's Got Talent. The prize was £100,000 and the opportunity to appear at the 2010 Royal Variety Performance.

After leaving Spelbound, Stranks joined Cirque du Soleil's show Quidam until the show retired in 2016. His latest project is working on a new show for Cirque du Soleil, based on the work of Argentinian band Soda Stereo.

References

External links
 

1994 births
Living people
British acrobatic gymnasts
Male acrobatic gymnasts
Britain's Got Talent contestants
People from Blackpool
Competitors at the 2009 World Games
World Games silver medalists
21st-century British people